The Diocese of Las Vegas is a Latin Church ecclesiastical territory or diocese of the Catholic Church in the southern Nevada region of the United States.  It comprises the Counties of Clark, Esmeralda, Lincoln, Nye, White Pine and is governed from the City of Las Vegas.  The Bishop of Las Vegas has his liturgical and canonical seat (cathedra) at the Guardian Angel Cathedral.

The See of Las Vegas is a suffragan diocese of the ecclesiastical province of the metropolitan Archdiocese of San Francisco.  Other suffragan sees include the Dioceses of Honolulu, Oakland, Reno, Sacramento, Salt Lake City, San Jose, Santa Rosa, and Stockton.

The Bishop of the Diocese of Las Vegas is The Most Reverend George Leo Thomas. On February 28, 2018, Pope Francis appointed Thomas as the third bishop of the diocese. The episcopal installation of Bishop Thomas was celebrated on May 15, 2018.

History
Originally a part of the Dioceses of Sacramento and Salt Lake City and later the Diocese of Reno, Pope John Paul II established the diocese on March 21, 1995 and was canonically erected on June 28.

Churches

Bishops
The list of bishops of the diocese and their years of service:
 Daniel F. Walsh (1995-2000), appointed Bishop of Santa Rosa in California
 Joseph A. Pepe (2001–2018)
 George Leo Thomas (2018–present)

Auxiliary Bishops
 Gregory W. Gordon (2021-present)

Education

Superintendents 
 Ellen F. Ayoub (1995–2006)
 Dr. Richard Facciolo (2006–2008)
 Catherine Thompson (2015–present)

High schools 
 Bishop Gorman High School, Las Vegas

Elementary schools 
 , opened Fall of 1959
 St. Anne Catholic School, opened Fall of 1954
 St. Anthony of Padua Catholic School, opened Fall of 2020
 St. Christopher Catholic School, opened Fall of 1964
 St. Elizabeth Ann Seton Catholic School
 St. Francis de Sales Catholic School, opened Fall of 1964 (shared space) in new building Fall of 1965.
 St. Viator School

See also

 Catholic Church in the United States
 Ecclesiastical Province of San Francisco
 List of the Catholic dioceses of the United States
 Global organisation of the Catholic Church
 List of Roman Catholic archdioceses (by country and continent)
 List of Roman Catholic dioceses (alphabetical) (including archdioceses)
 List of Roman Catholic dioceses (structured view) (including archdioceses)

References

External links
Roman Catholic Diocese of Las Vegas Official Site
Guardian Angel Cathedral Official Site

 
Catholic Church in Nevada
Las Vegas
Christian organizations established in 1995
Las Vegas
Las Vegas
1995 establishments in Nevada